Miss Venezuela 2005 was the 52nd Miss Venezuela pageant, was held in Caracas, Venezuela, on September 15, 2005, after weeks of events.  The winner of the pageant was Jictzad Viña, Miss Sucre.

The pageant was broadcast live on Venevision from the Poliedro de Caracas in Caracas, Venezuela. At the conclusion of the final night of competition, outgoing titleholder Mónica Spear crowned Jictzad Viña of Sucre as the new Miss Venezuela.

Results

Special awards

Delegates
The Miss Venezuela 2005 delegates are:

Notes
Jictzad Viña placed as 1st runner-up Reina Sudamericana 2005 in Santa Cruz, Bolivia.
Susan Carrizo placed as semifinalist in Miss Italia Nel Mondo 2008 in Jesolo, Italy.
Daniela Di Giacomo won Miss International 2006 in Beijing, China.
Alexandra Braun won Miss Earth 2005 in Quezon City, Philippines.
Dominika van Santen won Top Model of the World 2005 in Humen, China.
Marianne Puglia placed as 3rd runner-up in Miss Earth 2006 in Manila, Philippines.
Liliana Campa placed as 2nd runner-up in Reinado Internacional del Café 2006 in Manizales, Colombia.
Jennifer Schell won the Reinado Mundial del Banano 2007 in Machala, Ecuador. She also won Miss Tourism of the Millennium 2007 in Addis Ababa, Ethiopia. 
Angélika Hernández Dorendorf competed in Miss Germany 2007.

References

External links
Miss Venezuela official website

2005 beauty pageants
2005 in Venezuela